A stowaway is someone who travels illegally on a vehicle. 

Stowaway or Stowaways may also refer to:

Film and television

Film
Stowaway (1932 film), an American romance film
Stowaway (1936 film), starring Shirley Temple
Stowaway (1978 film), a Soviet comedy film
Stowaway (2001 film), directed by Clarence Fok
Stowaway (2021 film), a sci-fi thriller film
Stowaway (2022 film), a yacht thriller film

The Stowaway (1922 film), a German silent comedy film
The Stowaway (1958 film) or Le Passager clandestin, a French film starring Martine Carol and Karlheinz Böhm
The Stowaway (1997 film) or De Verstekeling, a Dutch film
The Stowaway (2014 film), a short based on the SF short story "The Cold Equations"

Television episodes
 "Stowaway", a 1993 episode of Hurricanes
 "Stowaways" (Monsters Inside Me), 2010
 "Stowaway" (Fringe), 2011

Literature
"The Callistan Menace" (working title "Stowaway"), a 1940 short story by Isaac Asimov
Stowaway, a 1961 novel by Lawrence Sargent Hall
The Stowaway, a 2000 novel in the Roswell High series by Melinda Metz
The Stowaway, the 2008 first novel in the Stone of Tymora series by R.A Salvatore

Music
"Stowaway", a song by Barbara Lyon, 1955
"The Stowaway", a song by Yamit Mamo from the Doctor Who episode "Voyage of the Damned", 2007

See also